Bratton Seymour is a village and civil parish in Somerset, England, situated on a tributary of the River Brue   south-east of Castle Cary and  north-west of Wincanton in the South Somerset district.  The parish has a population of 104.

History

The remains of a Roman villa, dating from 222 to 386, were discovered on Cattle Hill in 1966.

Bratton manor was held, like Wincanton, by Alfsi in 1066 and by Walter of Douai by the time of the Domesday Book in 1086, when it was known as Broctune meaning settlement on the brook. In the late 12th century land in the parish was given to Bruton Abbey, and later the lord of the manor were the Seymour family, whose name was incorporated into the village name. The parish of Bratton Seymour was part of the Norton Ferris Hundred.

A junction of the A371 just south of the village is known as Jack White's Gibbet as it was the site of the hanging of White for the murder of Robert Sutton in 1730.

Governance

The parish council has responsibility for local issues, including setting an annual precept (local rate) to cover the council's operating costs and producing annual accounts for public scrutiny. The parish council evaluates local planning applications and works with the local police, district council officers, and neighbourhood watch groups on matters of crime, security, and traffic. The parish council's role also includes initiating projects for the maintenance and repair of parish facilities, as well as consulting with the district council on the maintenance, repair, and improvement of highways, drainage, footpaths, public transport, and street cleaning. Conservation matters (including trees and listed buildings) and environmental issues are also the responsibility of the council.

The village falls within the Non-metropolitan district of South Somerset, which was formed on 1 April 1974 under the Local Government Act 1972, having previously been part of Wincanton Rural District. The district council is responsible for local planning and building control, local roads, council housing, environmental health, markets and fairs, refuse collection and recycling, cemeteries and crematoria, leisure services, parks, and tourism.

Somerset County Council is responsible for running the largest and most expensive local services such as education, social services, libraries, main roads, public transport, policing and fire services, trading standards, waste disposal and strategic planning.

It is also part of the Somerton and Frome county constituency represented in the House of Commons of the Parliament of the United Kingdom. It elects one Member of Parliament (MP) by the first past the post system of election, and was part of the South West England constituency of the European Parliament prior to Britain leaving the European Union in January 2020, which elected seven MEPs using the d'Hondt method of party-list proportional representation.

Religious sites

The Anglican parish Church of St Nicholas has Saxon origins. It was originally dedicated to St. Giles, and has also been known as Holy Trinity Church. It is designated as a Grade II* listed building.

References

External links

Villages in South Somerset
Civil parishes in Somerset